The Ohuhu clan of Umuahia north in Abia State Nigeria Igbo people, also referred to as Ohonhaw, form a unique  community of people in Umuahia, Abia state, Nigeria, consisting of several Autonomous Communities including Umukabia, Ohiya, Isingwu, Ofeme, Afugiri, Nkwoegwu, Umuawa, Umudiawa, Akpahia, Umuagu, Amaogugu, Umule-Eke-Okwuru, Umuhu-Okigha, Amaogwugwu called Eziama/ Amaudo in Ohuhu etc. Ohuhu was formerly known as Umuhu-na-Okaiuga, or better-known as Ohu-ahia-na-otu. Until 1949, the Umuopara clan used to be part of Ohuhu before they were carved out politically.

Origin
There are several beliefs regarding the origin of Ohuhu people. One view is that the Ohuhu people did not migrate from anywhere. This view is supported by the fact that most communities in Ohuhu have their old or abandoned settlements, Okpuala, also located in Ohuhu. While this view sounds plausible, some villages in Ohuhu today can convincingly trace their old settlements to places outside Ohuhu, even though they have another Okpuala now located in Ohuhu. Umukabia, Umuawa, Umuagu, Umungasi and Umudiawa are a few examples in this category.

It has been suggested that at least sections of the Umuhu people of Ohuhu came from Isuikwuato and Awgu areas. Far more persuasive than the rest is the theory that Ohuhu people migrated from parts of the present Etiti Division. Put so tersely, this theory leaves out a number of variants. For instance, one tradition claims that the movement began from Orsu and touched Okiwudo and Akaokwa all in the Orlu area. It then came to Anara-Osu. The tradition states that there, while the Ohuhu ancestors lingered, Obowo ancestors in the horde continued their movement and settled at their present location before Ohuhu people joined them.

Another version maintained that the Ohuhu people, with their Obowo counterparts, migrated from the Nekede area in Owerri. In connection with this theory, some writers believe that traditionally, the ancestors of Ohuhu-Ngwa formed part of a migration from the Agbaja area in Owerri and moved to the Imo River. Whether the migration began in Orlu, Nekede, Agba or Ahiara, all three centers are situated on the same unbroken stretch of land.

A recurrent name in these theories is Obowo – a clan occupying the area west of the Imo River. This river, lying between the Obowo and Ohuhu clans, is to both an important landmark. Whether the Ohuhu people migrated from Orlu area or Owerri they must, of necessity, have crossed the Obowo territory before arriving at their present settlement. This area could well have been a resting point of a protracted journey to a promised land.

Possible kinship between Ohuhu and Obowo is suggested in the fact that many places and village names in either of the clans have their exact counterparts in the other. The two broad divisions of Ikenga and Ihite, for example, exist in both. Umukabi and Umuagu villages are known to have, in recent times, common festivals with their Obowo counterparts to commemorate their kinship.

Umuawa people in Ohuhu likewise are said to have migrated from Umuoparaodu and Umudibi in Obowo, where traces of their settlements could still be identified today.

What appears to be the strongest argument in favor of Ohuhu-Obowo kinship is their common possession of a peculiar deity – Ajana, which stood supreme in both clans and belonged exclusively to both.

See also

Umukabia

References

External links
-The Community Website

Populated places in Abia State
Communities in Igboland
Igbo subgroups